The 2022 Republic of Karelia head election took place on 9–11 September 2022, on common election day. Incumbent Head Artur Parfenchikov was re-elected to a second term.

Background
Federal Bailiffs Service Director Artur Parfenchikov was appointed Head of Karelia in February 2017, replacing Alexander Khudilainen. Officially an Independent, Parfenchikov was nominated by United Russia as its head candidate in the following election, which he won with 61.34%.

During first term Parfenchikov faced numerous rumours about his potential resignation due to regional elite conflicts and general lack of accomplishments. In the 2021 Russian legislative election United Russia received 31.69% in Karelia, its 7th worst result nationally, which further fuelled speculations about Parfenchikov's replacement. However, Vedomosti reported in January 2022 that Artur Parfenchikov most likely would retain his position, and in May 2022 President Vladimir Putin endorsed Parfenchikov for reelection.

Due to the start of Russian special military operation in Ukraine in February 2022 and subsequent economic sanctions the cancellation and postponement of direct gubernatorial elections was proposed. The measure was even supported by A Just Russia leader Sergey Mironov. Eventually, the postponement never occurred, as on 3 June Legislative Assembly of the Republic of Karelia called head election for 11 September 2022.

In February 2022 regional CPRF and SR-ZP revealed that the parties were discussing a potential coalition in the upcoming election: one party would nominate a candidate for Head of Karelia, while candidate of the other party would be appointed to the Federation Council.

Candidates
Only political parties can nominate candidates for head election in Karelia, self-nomination is not possible. However, candidate is not obliged to be a member of the nominating party. Candidate for Head of Karelia should be a Russian citizen and at least 30 years old. Each candidate in order to be registered is required to collect at least 7% of signatures of members and heads of municipalities (84-88 signatures). Also gubernatorial candidates present 3 candidacies to the Federation Council and election winner later appoints one of the presented candidates.

Registered
 Anatoly Dudarin (DPR), unemployed
 Ivan Kadayas (Rodina), hiking tour guide
 Artur Parfenchikov (United Russia), incumbent Head of Karelia
 Andrey Rogalevich (SR-ZP), Member of Petrozavodsk City Council, former Member of Legislative Assembly of the Republic of Karelia (2011-2021)
 Yevgeny Ulyanov (CPRF), Member of Legislative Assembly of the Republic of Karelia, 2017 head candidate

Withdrew after registration
 Dmitry Fabrikantov (Party of Growth), businessman
 Valery Taborov (RPPSS), chairman of DOSAAF regional office

Failed to qualify
 Mikhail Fyodorov (New People), individual entrepreneur

Did not file
 Denis Bazankov (RPSS), journalist, former TV host
 Anna Dmitriyeva (Cossack Party), rifleman at Ministry of Transport guard
 Pavel Nesterov (Communists of Russia), administrator at the Center of Folk Art and Cultural Initiatives
 Aleksandr Pakkuyev (LDPR), Member of Legislative Assembly of the Republic of Karelia
 Sergey Yarlykov (Green Alternative), salesman

Declined
 Aleksey Orlov (LDPR), Member of Legislative Assembly of the Republic of Karelia
 Emilia Slabunova (Yabloko), Member of Legislative Assembly of the Republic of Karelia

Candidates for Federation Council
Anatoly Dudarin (DPR):
Nadezhda Romanova, storekeeper
Irina Tasova, store director
Anna Yakovleva, chair of Union of Karelian People
Dmitry Fabrikantov (Party of Growth):
Denis Korchin, businessman
Andrey Yerkoyev, businessman, hockey player
Igor Zhukov, businessman
Mikhail Fyodorov (New People):
Aleksey Goryayev, unemployed
Yury Kushnir, teacher of additional education
Vladimir Kvanin, Member of Legislative Assembly of the Republic of Karelia
Ivan Kadayas (Rodina):
Diana Bakhta, accountant
Andrey Grechnev, chairman of Rodina regional office
Zulfiya Yankina, pensioner
Artur Parfenchikov (United Russia):
Vladimir Chizhov, Ambassador of Russia to the European Union 
Nadezhda Dreyzis, Chair of Petrozavodsk City Council, chief doctor at city children policlinic №1
Aleksandr Rakitin, incumbent Senator
Andrey Rogalevich (SR-ZP):
Tatyana Kokhanskaya, Member of Ledmozero Council, teacher
Irina Safonova, Head of Shyoltozero
Mikhail Ukhanov, Member of Legislative Assembly of the Republic of Karelia
Valery Taborov (RPPSS):
Andrey Manin, chairman of RPPSS regional office, former Minister of Karelia for Nationalities' and Regional Policy (2006-2017)
Yury Stepanov, transport security inspector at Petrozavodsk Airport
Lidia Suvorova, Member of Legislative Assembly of the Republic of Karelia
Yevgeny Ulyanov (CPRF):
Sergey Andrunevich, Member of Legislative Assembly of the Republic of Karelia
Maria Gogoleva (SR-ZP), Member of Legislative Assembly of the Republic of Karelia
Gennady Stepanov, former Mayor of Olonets (2007-2011)

Finances
All sums are in rubles.

Results

|- style="background-color:#E9E9E9;text-align:center;"
! style="text-align:left;" colspan=2| Candidate
! style="text-align:left;"| Party
! width="75"|Votes
! width="30"|%
|-
| style="background-color:;"|
| style="text-align:left;"| Artur Parfenchikov (incumbent)
| style="text-align:left;"| United Russia
| 97,534
| 69.15
|-
| style="background-color:|
| style="text-align:left;"| Andrey Rogalevich
| style="text-align:left;"| A Just Russia — For Truth
| 18,910
| 13.41
|-
| style="background-color:|
| style="text-align:left;"| Yevgeny Ulyanov
| style="text-align:left;"| Communist Party
| 17,834
| 12.64
|-
| style="background-color:;"|
| style="text-align:left;"| Anatoly Dudarin
| style="text-align:left;"| Democratic Party
| 2,330
| 1.65
|-
| style="background-color:;"|
| style="text-align:left;"| Ivan Kadayas
| style="text-align:left;"| Rodina
| 865
| 0.61
|-
| style="text-align:left;" colspan="3"| Valid votes
| 137,473
| 97.46
|-
| style="text-align:left;" colspan="3"| Blank ballots
| 3,580
| 2.54
|- style="font-weight:bold"
| style="text-align:left;" colspan="3"| Total
| 141,053
| 100.00
|-
| style="background-color:#E9E9E9;" colspan="6"|
|-
| style="text-align:left;" colspan="3"| Turnout
| 141,053
| 27.93
|-
| style="text-align:left;" colspan="3"| Registered voters
| 504,958
| 100.00
|-
| colspan="5" style="background-color:#E9E9E9;"|
|- style="font-weight:bold"
| colspan="4" |Source:
|
|}

Ambassador of Russia to the European Union Vladimir Chizhov (Independent) was appointed to the Federation Council, replacing incumbent Senator Aleksandr Rakitin (Independent).

See also
2022 Russian gubernatorial elections

References

Karelia
Karelia
Politics of the Republic of Karelia